Pignedoli may refer to:

 22263 Pignedoli, minor aster discovered by Antonio Pignedoli, a mathematics professor at the Military Academy of Modena

People 
 Sabrina Pignedoli (born 1983),  Italian politician and Member of the European Parliament since 2019
 Sergio Pignedoli (1910–1980), a prominent Italian Cardinal of the Roman Catholic Church and a top candidate for Pope